Beraba cauera is a species of beetle in the family Cerambycidae. It was described by Galileo and Martins in 1999.

References

Beraba
Beetles described in 1999